Vinay Shakya is an Indian politician and a member of the 17th Legislative Assembly of Uttar Pradesh. He represents the Bidhuna (Auraiya) constituency of Uttar Pradesh and is a member of the Samajwadi Party. He did MA from KK Degree College Etawah, Kanpur University.

He joined Samajwadi Party after quitting Bharatiya Janata Party in 2022.

Posts held

See also
Uttar Pradesh Legislative Assembly

External links
Vinay Shakya at Twitter

References

Samajwadi Party politicians from Uttar Pradesh
People from Auraiya district
Living people
Uttar Pradesh MLAs 2017–2022
Year of birth missing (living people)
Former members of Bharatiya Janata Party from Uttar Pradesh
Bharatiya Janata Party politicians from Uttar Pradesh